Nothing but Hope and Passion (sometimes abbreviated as NBHAP) is a Berlin, Germany-based Internet publication devoted to music criticism, music news, artist interviews, guest mixes by artists as well as short films and "articles about life". NBHAP focuses on independent music, especially indie rock, indie pop, synthpop, chillwave, electronic music and post-rock. NBHAP was established in 2010, concentrates on new music and gives unknown acts a certain room.

Nothing but Hope and Passion (sometimes abbreviated as NBHAP) is a Berlin, Germany-based Internet publication devoted to music criticism, music news, artist interviews, guest mixes by artists as well as short films and "articles about life". NBHAP focuses on independent music, especially indie rock, indie pop, synthpop, chillwave, electronic music and post-rock. NBHAP was established in 2010, concentrates, on new music and gives unknown acts a certain room.

History
In early 2010, Robert Helbig, then currently about to study sociology in Jena, Germany, created NBHAP as a small site with only one video post per day.

In early 2011, NBHAP started to also interview artists, write record reviews and launched its own online radio station "Hope and Passion FM" which broadcasts "Bass Stop", a program that is fully dedicated to dubstep, drum and bass and related genres.

Since 2012, NBHAP is part of the Vice content-network music.

In early 2013, Helbig relocated to Berlin and opened an office in the Berlin office. During this time NBHAP also started to publish show reviews and launched a category titled "Sound of the Day and Night".

Concept
NBHAP tells: "The world we live in is becoming more fast-paced and diversified than ever before. It might seem hard not to drown in the myriad of possibilities and some of us decide to simply live rather than to create life. But there are people who want more. Nothing But Hope And Passion strives to connect those people. Individuals who consider open minded arts, culture and thought as something more than simply an afterthought to the life of labor. […] Nothing But Hope And Passion – the zine for everyone who thinks a bit more about life, who wants to get a bit more from life and who gives a bit more to live."

Besides music news, reviews of records and shows, interviews, the "Sound of the Day and Night" and guest mixes by artists, every week NBHAP also names an "album of the week". Furthermore, short films and "articles about life" (which include articles from fields such as politics, psychology, philosophy as well as anti-homophobia and anti-discrimination) are published.

References

External links
 

2010 establishments in Germany
Magazines established in 2010
Magazines published in Berlin
Music review websites
German music websites
Online music magazines published in Germany